Jiaomenxi Station is a subway station of the Beijing Subway. This is an interchange between Lines 4 and 10. The station handles 91,600 transfers between Lines 4 and 10 per day.

Station Layout 
Both the line 4 and line 10 stations have underground island platforms.

Exits 
There are 8 exits, lettered A1, A2, B, C, D, E, F, and G. Exits A2 and G are accessible.

Gallery

References

External links
 

Beijing Subway stations in Fengtai District
Railway stations in China opened in 2009